Alexandros Spyridon Mouzakitis (born 4 August 1994) is a Greek footballer who plays as a winger for A.E. Rodos and comes from the Panathinaikos youth ranks.

Career
On 19 October 2012, Mouzakitis along with three other players, signed his first professional contract with Panathinaikos F.C.. On 19 December 2012, he made his professional debut with Panathinaikos. Then, in 2014, he went on loan to Niki Volos F.C.. In January 2015, after contract termination with Panathinaikos, he joined Panionios F.C.. where he spent the rest of the season. Spending 1 year without a club, Mouzakitis joined S.S. Monopoli 1966 in July 2016. In the January 2017 transfer window, Mouzakitis joined A.E. Sparta P.A.E.. In January 2018, he was signed by A.E. Sparta P.A.E. for a second time where he spent the remaining of the season into. He then joined A.P.S. Kronos Argyrades F.C. during the summer of 2018, PAS Acheron Kanallaki F.C. in September 2019, Ypsonas FC in 2020, Aiolikos F.C. in 2021 and in August 2022 he joined A.E. Rodos.

Honours
Panathinaikos
→ Greek Cup: 2014

Career statistics

References

External links

 ΑΛΕΞΑΝΔΡΟΣ ΣΠΥΡΙΔΩΝ ΜΟΥΖΑΚΙΤΗΣ Στατιστικά 2020 - 2021
 

1994 births
Living people
Greek footballers
Greek expatriate footballers
Panathinaikos F.C. players
Niki Volos F.C. players
Panionios F.C. players
S.S. Monopoli 1966 players
A.E. Sparta P.A.E. players
Super League Greece players
Serie C players
Cypriot Second Division players
Association football wingers
Greek expatriate sportspeople in Italy
Expatriate footballers in Italy
Greek expatriate sportspeople in Cyprus
Expatriate footballers in Cyprus